is a passenger railway station in the city of Kiryū, Gunma, Japan, operated by the  third sector railway company Watarase Keikoku Railway. The Ryōmō Line of JR passes through without stopping.

Lines

Station layout
The station consists of a single side platform serving traffic in both direction. There is no station building. The station is unattended.

Adjacent stations

History
Shimo-Shinden Station opened on 14 March 1992.

Passenger statistics
In fiscal 2019, the station was used by an average of 57 passengers daily (boarding passengers only).

Surrounding area
 Kiryū Aioi Post Office

See also
 List of railway stations in Japan

References

External links

 Station information (Watarase Keikoku) 

Railway stations in Gunma Prefecture
Railway stations in Japan opened in 1992
Kiryū, Gunma